Caravan is a 1971 Indian romantic comedy thriller film directed by Nasir Hussain and produced by his brother Tahir Hussain, under the Nasir Hussain Films and T.V. Films banners. The film stars Jeetendra and Asha Parekh. Three Hussain fixtures were involved in the music production: composer R.D. Burman, lyricist Majrooh Sultanpuri, and singer Mohammad Rafi. The film's plot was loosely inspired by Girl on the Run (1953).

Caravan was a superhit domestically in India. It found even greater success abroad in China when it released there in 1979, becoming the highest-grossing foreign film in China. The film is estimated to have sold over  tickets in Asia, mostly in China. Adjusted for inflation, it is still one of the highest grossing Indian films of all time.

Plot
The film is an action thriller about a young woman, Sunita (Asha Parekh) and her father Mohandas (Murad), who finds out that his trusted employee, Rajan (Krishen Mehta), has been embezzling money from him. He confronts him but Rajan attacks him, flinging him out of the window of the multi-storyed building, but the police think that the death was accidental. This leaves the coast clear for Rajan to wed Mohandas' only daughter, Sunita. Sunita is distraught and ends up married to this "wrong" man, Rajan. Shortly after the wedding, Sunita finds out the truth. She thinks that Rajan has conspired with his girlfriend Monica (Helen) to murder her. So she runs away to find her father's old friend in Bangalore, who may be able to help. On the way, she experiences an accident and ends up with a band performing gypsies. She meets caravan van-driver Mohan (Jeetendra) and she is attracted to him. Sunita does not know that she has put herself in danger again - this time at the hands of knife-thrower, Nisha (Aruna Irani), who loves Mohan, and will kill anyone who gets in her way. To make matters worse, Rajan has not given up his search for Sunita.

Cast

 Jeetendra as Mohan
 Asha Parekh as Sunita / Soni
 Aruna Irani as Nisha
 Mehmood Jr. as Monto
 Helen as Monica
 Krishen Mehta as Rajan
 Ravindra Kapoor as Johny
 Madan Puri as Mithalal Tota
 Sanjana as Tara
 Manorama as Mrs. Tota
 Anwar Ali as Bhola
 Murad as Mohandas
 Dulari as Mohan's mom
 Shivraj as Karamchand

Production
The film was largely a Khan–Hussain family production, directed by Nasir Hussain (father of future filmmaker Mansoor Khan) and produced by his brother Tahir Hussain (father of future superstar Aamir Khan), under the Nasir Hussain Films banner.

The film's plot was loosely inspired by the 1953 film Girl on the Run, a little-known crime drama set against the backdrop of a carnival burlesque show, which was changed to a gypsy show in Caravan.

Soundtrack
The soundtrack of the film is one of the hit compositions by R. D. Burman.  The lyrics of the songs are provided by the veteran poet Majrooh Sultanpuri.

Box office
Caravan was declared a "Super Hit" domestically according to Box Office India. The film grossed  in India. It was the sixth highest-grossing film of 1971 at the domestic Indian box office.

Overseas, Caravan released in China in 1979 and became a blockbuster there, surpassing Raj Kapoor's Awaara (1951). Caravan became the highest-grossing foreign film ever in China up until then, with 88million box office admissions in its initial run. It reportedly sold a total of nearly 300million tickets including re-runs, the highest for any foreign film ever released in China.

In total, the film grossed an estimated  in Asia.

In terms of footfalls, the film sold an estimated million tickets in India, and nearly 300million tickets in China, for an estimated total of nearly million tickets sold in Asia.

Legacy
Along with Awaara and Noorie (1979), Caravan left a strong impression on Chinese audiences in the 1980s. It took decades before Tahir Hussain's son Aamir Khan later had a similar impact in China, with films such as Lagaan (2001), 3 Idiots (2009), PK (2014), and Dangal (2016). During his visit to China, Aamir Khan said his father's film Caravan is still fondly remembered there.

Awards and nominations

 19th Filmfare Awards:

Won

 Best Female Playback Singer – Asha Bhosle for "Piya Tu Ab To Aaja"

Nominated

 Best Supporting Actress – Aruna Irani
 Best Music Director – R. D. Burman

See also
 List of highest-grossing Indian films in overseas markets

Notes

References

External links 
 
  Caravan on YouTube

1971 films
1971 crime drama films
1970s Hindi-language films
1970s thriller drama films
Films directed by Nasir Hussain
Films scored by R. D. Burman
Indian crime drama films
Indian remakes of American films
Indian thriller drama films